Roy Evans (born 10 January 1930) is an actor who has appeared in British television from the 1960s to 2004, appearing in a wide range of productions including Doctor Who (The Daleks' Master Plan as Trantis, The Green Death as Bert and The Monster of Peladon as a miner), Blake's 7 ("Redemption" as a Slave), Porterhouse Blue (as Arthur), Only Fools and Horses (The Jolly Boys' Outing as Harry the coach driver), as well as peasant roles in The Black Adder.

Born in Fishponds, he was adopted by Edmund Evans and Clarice Augusta Georgina May Evans (née Gowen). As a teenager, Evans went to London to become a dancer and actor. His dancing work includes visiting the Nottingham Theatre Royal with the International Ballet Company in 1951, gaining a long run in A Girl Called Jo at Piccadilly Theatre followed by a six-month engagement as principal male ballet dancer with the Swedish national ballet company.

In film he is particularly known for roles in Oliver! (1968), Decline and Fall... of a Birdwatcher (1968), Where's Jack? (1969), Loving Memory (1971), Dark Places (1973), Jabberwocky (1977), The Prince and the Pauper (1977), Raise the Titanic (1980), The Elephant Man (1980) and The Company of Wolves (1984).

References

External links

 
 Roy Evans at Theatricalia

Living people
British male film actors
British male television actors
1930 births